Rierguscha bicolor is a species of beetle in the family Cerambycidae. It was described by Viana in 1970.

References

Unxiini
Beetles described in 1970